Trombidium raeticum is a species of mite in the genus Trombidium in the family Trombidiidae. It is found in Switzerland.

Name
The species name refers to the ancient region of Raetia, which includes modern Switzerland.

References
 Synopsis of the described Arachnida of the World: Trombidiidae

Further reading
  (1963): Die Landmilben der Schweiz (Mittelland, Jura und Alpen): Trombidiformes.

Trombidiidae
Endemic fauna of Switzerland
Animals described in 1963